Arachnothryx is a genus of flowering plants in the family Rubiaceae. It contains about 107 species. It is found from Mexico to Peru and in Trinidad.

Taxonomy
Arachnothryx was named by Jules Émile Planchon in 1849. This generic name is derived from Ancient Greek: arachne or arachnos, "a spider", and thrix or trichos, "hair".

As currently circumscribed, Arachnothryx is paraphyletic over Cuatrecasasiodendron, Gonzalagunia, and Javorkaea. Some authors have included these genera in a broadly defined Rondeletia, but molecular phylogenetic studies have shown that they are more closely related to Guettarda than to Rondeletia.

Species

 Arachnothryx aspera (Standl.) Borhidi
 Arachnothryx atravesadensis (Lorence) Borhidi
 Arachnothryx bertieroides (Standl.) Borhidi
 Arachnothryx brachytyrsa Borhidi
 Arachnothryx brenesii (Standl.) Borhidi
 Arachnothryx buddleioides (Benth.) Planch.
 Arachnothryx calycophylla Steyerm.
 Arachnothryx calycosa (Donn.Sm.) Borhidi
 Arachnothryx capitellata (Hemsl.) Borhidi
 Arachnothryx caucana (Standl. ex Steyerm.) Steyerm.
 Arachnothryx chaconii (Lorence) Borhidi
 Arachnothryx chiapensis (Brandegee) Borhidi
 Arachnothryx chimalaparum Lorence ex Borhidi
 Arachnothryx chimboracensis (Standl.) Steyerm.
 Arachnothryx chiriquiana (Lorence) Borhidi
 Arachnothryx colombiana (Rusby) Steyerm.
 Arachnothryx costanensis Steyerm.
 Arachnothryx costaricensis (Standl.) Borhidi
 Arachnothryx cupreiflora (K.Schum. & K.Krause) Steyerm.
 Arachnothryx darienensis (Standl.) Borhidi
 Arachnothryx discolor (Kunth) Planch.
 Arachnothryx dwyeri (Lorence) Borhidi
 Arachnothryx educta (Standl. ex Steyerm.) Steyerm.
 Arachnothryx euryphylla (Standl.) Steyerm.
 Arachnothryx evansii (Lorence) Borhidi
 Arachnothryx flocculosa Borhidi
 Arachnothryx fosbergii Steyerm.
 Arachnothryx galeottii (Standl.) Borhidi
 Arachnothryx garciae Standl. ex Steyerm.
 Arachnothryx ginetteae (Lorence) Borhidi
 Arachnothryx glabrata (Standl.) Steyerm.
 Arachnothryx gonzaleoides (Standl.) Borhidi
 Arachnothryx gracilis (Hemsl.) Borhidi
 Arachnothryx gracilispica (Standl.) Borhidi
 Arachnothryx guerrerensis (Lorence) Borhidi
 Arachnothryx guettardioides Standl. ex Steyerm.
 Arachnothryx heteranthera (Brandegee) Borhidi
 Arachnothryx hispidula Griseb.
 Arachnothryx hondurensis (Donn.Sm.) Lorence
 Arachnothryx izabalensis (Standl. & Steyerm.) Borhidi
 Arachnothryx jurgensenii (Hemsl.) Borhidi
 Arachnothryx laniflora (Benth.) Planch.
 Arachnothryx latiloba Borhidi
 Arachnothryx leucophylla (Kunth) Planch.
 Arachnothryx lineolata Borhidi
 Arachnothryx linguiformis (Hemsl.) Borhidi
 Arachnothryx linguiloba Borhidi & Diego
 Arachnothryx lojensis Steyerm.
 Arachnothryx macrocalyx (Standl. & Steyerm.) Borhidi
 Arachnothryx manantlanensis (Lorence) Borhidi
 Arachnothryx megalantha (Lorence) Lorence
 Arachnothryx mexicana (Turcz.) Borhidi
 Arachnothryx michoacana Borhidi
 Arachnothryx monteverdensis (Lorence) Borhidi
 Arachnothryx monticola Borhidi
 Arachnothryx myriantha (Standl. & Steyerm.) Borhidi
 Arachnothryx nebulosa (Standl.) Borhidi
 Arachnothryx nelsonii Lorence
 Arachnothryx nitida (Hemsl.) Borhidi
 Arachnothryx ovandensis (Lundell) Borhidi
 Arachnothryx ovata (Rusby) Steyerm.
 Arachnothryx pansamalana (Standl.) Borhidi
 Arachnothryx pauciflora Borhidi
 Arachnothryx perezii (Standl. ex Steyerm.) Steyerm.
 Arachnothryx peruviana (Standl.) Steyerm.
 Arachnothryx povedae (Lorence) Borhidi
 Arachnothryx purpurea (Lorence) Borhidi
 Arachnothryx pyramidalis (Lundell) Borhidi
 Arachnothryx reflexa (Benth.) Planch.
 Arachnothryx rekoi (Standl.) Borhidi
 Arachnothryx ricoae (Lorence) Borhidi
 Arachnothryx rosea Linden
 Arachnothryx rubens (L.O.Williams) Borhidi
 Arachnothryx rufescens (B.L.Rob.) Borhidi
 Arachnothryx rugulosa (Standl.) Steyerm.
 Arachnothryx rzedowskii (Lorence) Borhidi
 Arachnothryx sanchezii Borhidi & Salas-Mor.
 Arachnothryx scabra (Hemsl.) Borhidi
 Arachnothryx scoti (Lorence) Borhidi
 Arachnothryx secunda (Standl.) Borhidi
 Arachnothryx secundiflora (B.L.Rob.) Borhidi
 Arachnothryx septicidalis (B.L.Rob.) Borhidi
 Arachnothryx sessilis Borhidi & G.Ortiz
 Arachnothryx sinaloae Borhidi
 Arachnothryx skutchii (Standl. & Steyerm.) Borhidi
 Arachnothryx sousae Borhidi
 Arachnothryx spectabilis (Steyerm.) Rova
 Arachnothryx stachyoidea (Donn.Sm.) Borhidi
 Arachnothryx subglabra Borhidi & N.C.Jiménez
 Arachnothryx tacanensis (Lundell) Borhidi
 Arachnothryx tayloriae (Lorence) Borhidi
 Arachnothryx tenorioi (Lorence) Borhidi
 Arachnothryx tenuisepala Borhidi
 Arachnothryx thiemei (Donn.Sm.) Borhidi
 Arachnothryx torresii (Standl.) Borhidi
 Arachnothryx tuxtlensis (Lorence & Cast.-Campos) Borhidi
 Arachnothryx uxpanapensis (Lorence & Cast.-Campos) Borhidi
 Arachnothryx venezuelensis Steyerm.
 Arachnothryx villosa (Hemsl.) Borhidi
 Arachnothryx wendtii (Lorence & Cast.-Campos) Borhidi

References

External links

Arachnothryx in the World Checklist of Rubiaceae
 Arachnothryx At: Index Nominum Genericorum At: References At: NMNH Department of Botany At: Research and Collections At: Smithsonian National Museum of Natural History
 Arachnothryx At Plant Names At: IPNI
 Arachnothryx In: Volume 5 (1849) Of: Fl. Serres Jard. Eur. At: Titles At: Botanicus
 Arachnothryx At: List of Genera At: Rubiaceae At: List of families At: Families and Genera in GRIN At: Queries At: GRIN taxonomy for plants
 Arachnothryx At: Choose a Plant At: Meet the Plants At: National Tropical Botanical Garden

Rubiaceae genera
Guettardeae
Taxonomy articles created by Polbot
Flora without expected TNC conservation status